Carsten Ball and Travis Rettenmaier were the defending champions, but Ball chose to not participate this year.
Rettenmaier partnered up with Brett Ross. They lost to Luka Gregorc and Andrea Stoppini in the first round.
Scott Lipsky and David Martin won in the final 7–6(3), 4–6, 10–6, against Lester Cook and Donald Young.

Seeds

Draw

Draw

External links
 Doubles Draw

Home Depot Center USTA Challenger - Doubles
USTA LA Tennis Open